Laurel Canyon is a planned light rail station in the Los Angeles County Metro Rail system. The station is part of the East San Fernando Light Rail Project and planned to open in 2028. It is located in Arleta, California and features an island platform on the north side of on Van Nuys Boulevard at the intersection with Laurel Canyon Boulevard.

References

Future Los Angeles Metro Rail stations
Railway stations scheduled to open in 2028